Autumn Song is part of Mannheim Steamroller's Ambience collection.  It was released in 2003 on CD by American Gramaphone and features 8 autumnal tracks.

The Ambience collection is a series of natural recordings with musical elements composed by Chip Davis.

Back cover excerpt:  "Recall memories of another time.  Autumn Song features the unique sounds of the season, from a harvest celebration to leaves scurrying across nature's floor."

Track listing
 "Remembering Castles" – 6:49
 "Walking in Straw Grass" – 7:25
 "The Crow Knows (or just be caw caw cause)" – 5:37
 "Blowing Leaves" – 7:08
 "Harvest Dance" – 12:40
 "Golden Sunset" – 5:48
 "Full Moon" – 4:06
 "Wooden Tent" – 1:19

Personnel
Bobby Jenkins – Oboe

References
Mannheim Steamroller Autumn Song compact disc.  American Gramaphone AG204-2

Mannheim Steamroller albums
2003 albums
American Gramaphone albums